Abercorn School is a 'family' of schools in central London which offers an inspiring and caring academic atmosphere for pupils ages 2–13 years. In September 2021, Abercorn School announced that the school will begin welcoming 13–14 year olds from September 2022 as part of a wider expansion plan to welcome 11–18 year olds over the coming years. As part of this expansion, additional premises have been secured.

Abercorn School now has four separate premises, all within walking distance in St John's Wood and Marylebone, London. The school was opened in 1987 by Andrea Greystoke.

Abercorn uses the Early Years Foundation Stage and the National Curriculum as a basis for teaching. Pupils typically move on to a wide range of Independent secondary schools or boarding schools, with students now also progressing on to Abercorn's new Senior School. Pupils are prepared for the 11+ and 13+ examinations.

Abercorn School is a member of ISA, the Independent Schools Association, and also IAPS, the Independent Association of Preparatory Schools.

Around a third of students at Abercorn are international, a significant number of which are from North America.

Background
Abercorn was founded in 1987 by Andrea Greystoke, who early in her teaching days was the first female teacher at St. Paul’s Boys’ School, and then similarly at King’s College School, London.

Abercorn started as a pre-prep on Abercorn Place, London, accepting students aged 2–8 years old. To accept older students and provide further facilities, Abercorn expanded throughout the years. In 2002, due to increased demand, the school’s Marylebone Road premises opened, which was originally the home of the Old Grammar School. In 2014, the school expanded further and opened its Portland Place premises which is home to those aged 9–13. Most recently, a new Paddington Street premises has been acquired for future use as a Senior School.

The Paddington Street premises is a beautifully converted former church which was formerly home to renowned Pineapple Dance Studios. The building was also previously used by Regent's University London. There is ample space for dedicated classrooms, a purposeful built theatre, and access to outdoor space at nearby Paddington Gardens.

Education and Extracurricular Activities
Abercorn School provides expert teaching in a range of specialist subjects. Yoga, Music and French are taught by dedicated subject teachers from the age of 2, weekly swimming from age 3, and all students also learn the clarinet from age 8. The school also offers a variety of extra-curricular activities for all age groups, including Gymnastics, Taekwondo, Sports, Drama and Art for the youngest students. For the older students, extra-curricular activities include Athletics, Football, Netball, Art, Computer Coding and Choir.

Abercorn School places a great importance on pastoral care and the development of children's individual, personal, social and emotional skills.

The British International School of New York
Andrea Greystoke, Founder of Abercorn School, also set up a sister school in the US, the British International School of New York, which opened in 2006.

References

External links 
 Abercorn School

1987 establishments in England
Educational institutions established in 1987
Private co-educational schools in London
Private schools in the City of Westminster
Preparatory schools in London